Koné  is a commune in the North Province of New Caledonia, a special collectivity of France in the Pacific Ocean. Koné is the provincial seat of the North Province.

Geography

Climate

Koné has a tropical savanna climate (Köppen climate classification Aw).

Politics and regional development
Koné is the seat of the government of the Northern Province, dominated since the Province was established by pro-Independence politicians. The aim has been to develop Koné and neighbouring towns into an economic growth pole, anchored by the large Koniambo project and nickel mine. The idea has been to give Kanak peoples job opportunities independent from France and the loyalist Southern Province.  This 'VKP' zone is now established, with a marked increase in business activity, construction, and public facilities (library, cinema, swimming pool) since the mid 2000s.

References

External links 

Communes of New Caledonia